Tomaso Cecchino ( – 31 August 1644) was an Italian composer active in Croatia.

Cecchino was born in Soave. After attending the school of acolytes in Verona, he moved in 1603 to Dalmatia, where for a time he was in charge of the music in Split Cathedral. He held this post until 1607, and returned to it in 1613, probably at the invitation of Bishop Marcantonio de Dominis. In December 1614 he left Split to become director of music in Hvar Cathedral, where he remained for the rest of his life. In Hvar he raised the standard of music to previously unattained heights.

Cecchino contributed significantly to the diffusion of the monodic style of music in Dalmatia. His works were known primarily in Germany and other countries of western Europe, where they appeared in several printed collections of music. The composer Michael Praetorius refers to him in the third volume of his Syntagma musicum.

Sources
 Harvard Dictionary of Music
 
 

1580s births
1644 deaths
Year of birth uncertain
People from the Province of Verona
17th-century Italian composers
Italian male composers
17th-century male musicians